April Sue-Lyn Jones (4 April 2007 – ) was a Welsh child from Machynlleth, Powys, who disappeared on 1 October 2012, after being sighted getting into a vehicle near her home. The disappearance of April Jones, aged five, generated a large amount of national and international press coverage. A 46-year-old English man, Mark Bridger, was subsequently arrested and convicted.

On 30 May 2013, Bridger was found guilty of April's abduction and murder, in addition to perverting the course of justice. He was sentenced to life imprisonment with a whole life tariff, meaning he will never be released.

Disappearance
On the evening of 1 October 2012, April Jones attended swimming lessons at a local leisure centre while her mother and father attended a parents' evening at her school. Afterwards, April invited a friend from school, aged seven, to come to her house to watch the film Tangled. After that, April pleaded with her parents to allow her to play with her friend outside despite the late hour. April's parents eventually gave in, with her mother telling the girl that she did not want April to be out for too long. April Jones was last seen by her parents, riding her small pink bicycle, at approximately 7pm. At 7.15pm, Jones was playing with her friends at the Bryn-y-Gog housing estate in Machynlleth.

Approximately 20 minutes after allowing April to leave the house, her mother Coral set out to search for her. At 7.29pm, having been unable to find her daughter, Coral dialled 999 to report April missing and summoned an officer from the Dyfed–Powys Police. The first officer on the scene spoke to a child witness who reported seeing April climbing into a grey van. The Dyfed–Powys Police immediately upgraded the investigation to a "critical incident" and launched a massive search across Machynlleth. Scores of civilians, some alerted by social networks, joined in the search, with the number swelling into the hundreds by the early morning hours of 2 October.

Search
On 3 October 2012, April’s mother made an appeal for information about her daughter. The following day, Prime Minister David Cameron also issued an appeal to the public, commenting that "clearly having this happen to you, and the fact that she suffers from cerebral palsy, something I know a little about from my own children, only makes this worse. My appeal would be to everyone. If you know anything, if you saw anything, heard anything, have any ideas you can bring forward, talk to the police."

In the days following her disappearance, a large search operation for April was mounted around the Machynlleth area, involving police and search and rescue teams using specialised equipment, as well as hundreds of volunteers. On 12 December, police stated that the search for April would continue into 2013.

On 27 March 2013, police revealed that they would call off the search after another month of being unable to locate her body, and on 22 April, police confirmed that the search had officially ended. The police stated that "a reactive team of specialist officers are available to respond to any new information that is received". This was the largest missing person search in UK police history.

Murder inquiry
Mark Bridger, a 46-year-old local man, was arrested on the afternoon of 2 October 2012, less than 24 hours after April went missing. He became a suspect in the case because he matched a description of the man and the vehicle, a left-hand drive Land Rover Discovery which an eyewitness had seen April entering following a conversation with the man.

On 5 October 2012, police officially designated the case a murder inquiry; even though a body had not been found, this was the first indication that the police now had reason to believe that April Jones was dead. Sky News presenter Kay Burley was accused of insensitivity after breaking the news of Jones' probable death live on-air to volunteers who had been searching for her. The interviewees were unaware the case had changed from a search for a missing person into a murder inquiry.

On 6 October, Bridger was charged with child abduction, murder, and attempting to pervert the course of justice. He appeared before magistrates at Aberystwyth on 8 October, where he was additionally charged with the unlawful concealment and disposal of a body. He was remanded into custody and held at HMP Manchester pending an appearance at Caernarfon Crown Court, which occurred on 10 October via videolink.

On 14 January 2013, at Mold Crown Court, Bridger pleaded not guilty to the charge of murdering April Jones, but accepted that he was "probably responsible" for her death. The trial was to begin on 25 February at Mold Crown Court, but it was adjourned until 29 April at the request of Bridger's defence team in order to make further inquiries.

Mark Bridger
Mark Leonard Bridger was born at the War Memorial Hospital in Carshalton, Surrey, on 6 November 1965, the second of three children born to policeman Graham Bridger and his wife Pamela. He has an older sister and younger brother. He grew up in a semi-detached house in Wallington, Surrey. He attended John Ruskin High School in Croydon, leaving with seven CSEs.

Bridger had a string of convictions for minor offences stretching back to the mid-1980s. When he was 19 he was convicted of firearms offences and theft. He moved to Wales in the 1980s, and there he was convicted of criminal damage, affray, and driving without insurance in 1991. The next year, he was convicted again, for driving whilst disqualified and without insurance. In 2004, he was convicted of battery and threatening behaviour; in 2007 he received his fifth conviction, this time for assault.

Bridger's work history was varied; he had been an abattoir worker, hotel porter, fireman, lifeguard, mechanic, and welder. He fathered six children by four women, and was married once, to the mother of two of his children, from 1990 until the marriage ended in divorce several years later.

Trial
The trial of Mark Bridger began on 29 April 2013 before Mr Justice Griffith Williams. A scientific expert told the court that fragments of human bone consistent with a "younger individual" had been found in the fireplace of Bridger's cottage. Blood found in several parts of the cottage was matched to April's DNA, and was enough to convince the police that April Jones had suffered injuries from which she could not have survived - and to persuade the Crown Prosecution Service to charge Bridger with murder.

In his defence, Bridger claimed that he had accidentally run over April in his car and could not remember disposing of her body due to alcohol and panic. On 29 May the judge concluded his summing-up, and directed the jury to retire to consider its verdicts. On 30 May 2013, Bridger was found guilty of abduction, murder, and perverting the course of justice. Later that day, he was sentenced to life imprisonment with a whole life order, having been called a "pathological and glib liar" and "a paedophile" by the judge.

After the verdict, it was revealed that Bridger had confessed to the Strangeways prison chaplain that he had disposed of April's body in the fast-flowing Afon Dulas, which flows past Bridger's house before terminating in the River Dyfi near Machynlleth. Dyfed-Powys Police have said they doubt Bridger's claims and believe he scattered April's remains across the countryside near his house.

In July 2013, several weeks into his sentence, Bridger was attacked in Wakefield prison by a fellow prisoner with an improvised weapon, resulting in facial and throat injuries, for which he received sutures. In December 2013, Bridger commenced an appeal against his whole-life tariff, but dropped the appeal a month later, days before it was due to be heard.

Aftermath

Funeral
Although her body was never found, 17 fragments of bone were recovered from the fireplace in Bridger's cottage. The funeral service for April Jones was held in Machynlleth on 26 September 2013.

Changes to web search engines
After Bridger's arrest, police discovered an extensive collection of child pornography on his computer.

In November 2013, following campaigning by Jones' parents which was also backed by several national newspapers, the search engines Google and Bing modified their systems to block results from searches aimed at producing child abuse images.

House in Ceinws
On 4 August 2014, it was announced that the cottage in Ceinws where April is believed to have been killed, had been purchased by the Welsh Government for £149,000, having stood empty since Bridger's arrest nearly two years earlier. The cottage was demolished in November 2014. April's family watched the house being demolished.

See also
List of murder convictions without a body
List of solved missing person cases

References

2010s missing person cases
2012 in Wales
2012 murders in the United Kingdom
Female murder victims
Deaths by person in Wales
Missing person cases in Wales
Murder convictions without a body
Murder in Wales
October 2012 crimes
October 2012 events in the United Kingdom
Incidents of violence against girls